The St. Cloud State Huskies men's ice hockey team is a National Collegiate Athletic Association (NCAA) Division I college ice hockey program that represents St. Cloud State University. The Huskies are a member of the National Collegiate Hockey Conference. They play at the Herb Brooks National Hockey Center in St. Cloud, Minnesota.

History

Formation and war years
St. Cloud State Teachers College founded its varsity ice hockey program in 1931, joining several other Minnesota-based schools. After an expectedly poor first season, St. Cloud began dominating their competition under Ludwig Andolsek, the team's second head coach. During the third year, a freshman named Frank Brimsek served as the team's starter. Brimsek was so spectacular in goal that he left after just one season and began a professional career, a rarity for college players at the time. While Brimsek would go on to have a Hall of Fame career, the Huskies didn't appear to miss him and went 25–2 in 1935, posting the best record in the nation. However, because only one of their games was played against a fellow institution, the Huskies weren't considered for the intercollegiate championship.

Andolsek left after his third season and the team struggled in his absence. In the seven years that followed, the team hovered around .500 and were relegated to secondary status. In 1942, due to the United States entry into World War II, St. Cloud suspended many of its athletic programs, which included the ice hockey team. The program was restarted after the war and saw some success, however, because the program was not a member of any conference, the Huskies were occasionally hamstrung by a lack of playing time.

Wink and Basch
In 1956, After going through six different head coaches in ten years, the team hired Jack Wink. The new bench boss stabilized the program and led the Huskies to stellar records in the early-60's. The team finished the 1962 season undefeated but, as had happened a decade earlier, a reduced schedule following those highs caused the team to fall on hard times by the late-60's. After successive 1-win seasons, Wink was replaced by Charlie Basch who set about a steady rebuild for the program.

Basch took almost twice as long as Wink had to turn the Huskies in consistent winners. Once he did, however, he was able to keep them at the top of their game for much longer. In 1978, the NCAA began sponsoring a Division II Tournament. Because St. Cloud was one of the few western teams that did not participate in the NAIA Championship, they were invited to participate in a Western Championship Tournament, which would determine which two teams received bids. St. Cloud State played in the WCT for the first four years of its existence, unfortunately they were never able to win a single match and never received an invitation to the actual tournament.

In 1980, the Huskies finally ended their long run as an independent and helped found the NCHA. Poor results in conference play prevented the team from having a chance at an NCAA bid, a trend that continued as almost all Division II programs dropped down to Division III in 1984.

Swift climb to D-I
John Perpich took over for Basch in 1984 and led the team through two mediocre seasons before the athletic department decided to raise the profile of the program. Perpich stepped aside and allowed legendary Minnesota coach Herb Brooks to take over in 1986. News of the move spurred several prospects to join the program, including NHL draft picks Tony Schmalzbauer and Shorty Forrest. The Huskies went on to win the program's first conference title (tied) and the first conference tournament ever played by the NCHA. Brooks' team was one of the favorites for the national championship despite being a debutant but they were stymied by Oswego State and ended up 3rd in 1987.

Brooks left after the year to return to the NHL, but his time with the team had been a success. The very next year, St. Cloud promoted the program to Division I with Brooks' assistant, Craig Dahl taking over. The Huskies continued their rapid ascent with a winning record in 1989 and, due in part to the NCAA's policy of including a non-tradition team in the tournament at the time, St. Cloud made its first appearance in the D-I tournament in 1989.

WCHA
After three years as an independent, St. Cloud joined the WCHA in 1990. Widely regarded as the best conference at the time, the WCHA made it difficult for St. Cloud to compete for a further NCAA bid. In spite of the tough opposition, the Huskies thrived in their new conference and routinely finished in the top half of the standings. There were several near-misses for championships and tournament bids but, at the end of the 20th century, the Huskies finally returned to the national tournament. In three consecutive years, St. Cloud made the NCAA tournament but lost each game they played. The program then declined for a few years and Dahl stepped down after the 2005 season.

Bob Motzko, an alumnus of the team, took over and swiftly turned the team's fortunes. In his first five seasons he got the Huskies to appear in two WCHA championship games. Though he lost both, he was able to get the Huskies their first win in NCAA tournament play. Three years later, Motzko led the team to its first WCHA regular season title and led the Huskies to the Frozen Four.

NCHC
After the deep playoff run, St. Cloud State joined with seven other schools to form the NCHC in the response to the Big Ten Conference joining the ice hockey ranks. The new league was built around traditional powerhouses and the Huskies looked right at home, winning the inaugural regular season title. Under Motzko, St. Cloud continued as one of the top teams in the conference, receiving 4 NCAA bids over a five-year span. In 2018, St. Cloud was the #1 team in the nation as it began the tournament but were upset in the first game by Air force.

Motzko left after the year to take over at in-state rival Minnesota and he was replaced by Brett Larson. The Huskies only seemed to get better under their new coach and were again the top-seeded team in 2019. Despite dominating play for most of their opening match, the Huskies were again felled by the lowest-seeded team. After a down year that was curtailed by the COVID-19 pandemic, St. Cloud returned with a strong 2021 and reached the championship game for the first time in its history.

Season-by-season results

Source:

Records vs. current NCHC teams
As of the completion of 2021–22 season

Head coaches
As of the completion of 2022–23 season

Players

Current roster
As of August 23, 2022.

Statistical Leaders
Source:

Career points leaders

Career goaltending leaders

GP = Games played; Min = Minutes played; W = Wins; L = Losses; T = Ties; GA = Goals against; SO = Shutouts; SV% = Save percentage; GAA = Goals against average

Minimum 30 games

Statistics current through the start of the 2020-21 season.

Awards and honors

Hockey Hall of Fame
Source:

Frank Brimsek (1966)
Herb Brooks (2006)

United States Hockey Hall of Fame
Source:

Frank Brimsek (1973)
Herb Brooks (1990)

NCAA

Individual awards

Hobey Baker Award
Drew LeBlanc: 2013

Tim Taylor Award
Andreas Nödl: 2007

All-Americans
AHCA First Team All-Americans

2001-02: Mark Hartigan, F
2012-13: Nick Jensen, D; Drew LeBlanc, F
2013-14: Nic Dowd, F
2016-17: Charlie Lindgren, G; Ethan Prow, D
2017-18: Jimmy Schuldt, D
2018-19: Jimmy Schuldt, D; Patrick Newell, F

AHCA Second Team All-Americans

1992-93: Fred Knipscheer, F
1996-97: Mark Parrish, F
1999-00: Mike Pudlick, D
2000-01: Scott Meyer, G
2005-06: Bobby Goepfert, G
2006-07: Bobby Goepfert, G
2007-08: Ryan Lasch, F
2018-19: Jack Ahcan, D; Blake Lizotte, F

WCHA

Individual awards

Player of the Year
Mark Hartigan: 2002
Drew LeBlanc: 2013

Outstanding Student-Athlete of the Year
Kyle McLaughlin: 1999
Drew LeBlanc: 2013

Defensive Player of the Year
Nick Jensen: 2013

Freshman of the Year
Andreas Nödl: 2007

Coach of the Year
Craig Dahl: 1998
Bob Motzko: 2006, 2007

Most Valuable Player in Tournament
Tyler Arnason: 2001

All-Conference Teams
First Team All-WCHA

1990-91: Bret Hedican, D
1992-93: Fred Knipscheer, F
1999-00: Mike Pudlick, D
2000-01: Scott Meyer, G
2001-02: Mark Hartigan, F
2005-06: Bobby Goepfert, G
2006-07: Bobby Goepfert, G; Andrew Gordon, F
2007-08: Ryan Lasch, F
2008-09: Ryan Lasch, F
2012-13: Nick Jensen, D; Drew LeBlanc, F

Second Team All-WCHA

1993-94: Kelly Hultgren, D
1994-95: Kelly Hultgren, D
1996-97: Dave Paradise, F; Matt Cullen, F
1997-98: Brian Leitza, G
1999-00: Scott Meyer, G; Tyler Arnason, F
2000-01: Duvie Wescott, D
2001-02: Dean Weasler, G; Nate DiCasmirro, F
2007-08: Andreas Nödl, F; Garrett Roe, F
2008-09: Garrett Raboin, D
2009-10: Ryan Lasch, F

Third Team All-WCHA

1995–96: Taj Melson, F
1996–97: Sacha Molin, F
1997–98: Josh DeWolf, F
2000–01: Mark Hartigan, F; Brandon Sampair, F
2006–07: Andreas Nödl, F
2008–09: Garrett Roe, F
2009–10: Dan Dunn, G; Garrett Raboin, D; Garrett Roe, F
2010–11: Drew LeBlanc, F
2011–12: Nick Jensen, D

All-WCHA Rookie Team

1991–92: Sandy Gasseau, F
1994–95: Brian Leitza, G
1995–96: Matt Cullen, F
1998–99: Tyler Arnason, F
2001–02: Matt Gens, D; Mike Doyle, F; Peter Szabo, F
2006–07: Andreas Nödl, F; Ryan Lasch, F
2007–08: Garrett Roe, F
2011–12: Andrew Prochno, D

NCHC

Individual awards

Player of the Year
 Ethan Prow; 2016
 Jimmy Schuldt; 2019

Rookie of the Year
 Veeti Miettinen; 2021

Goaltender of the Year
 Charlie Lindgren; 2016

Forward of the Year
 Patrick Newell; 2019

Defensive Forward of the Year
 Nic Dowd; 2014

Defenseman of the Year
 Ethan Prow; 2016

Defensive Defenseman of the Year
 Will Borgen; 2018
 Jimmy Schuldt; 2019

Offensive Defenseman of the Year
 Ethan Prow; 2016

Scholar-Athlete of the Year
 Nic Dowd; 2014

Sportsmanship Award
 Nick Oliver; 2015
 Patrick Newell; 2019
 Kevin Fitzgerald; 2021

Herb Brooks Coach of the Year
 Bob Motzko; 2014, 2018
 Brett Larson; 2019

Frozen Faceoff MVP
 Mikey Eyssimont; 2016

All-Conference Teams
First Team All-NCHC

 2013–14: Nic Dowd, F
 2014–15: Jonny Brodzinski, F
 2015–16: Charlie Lindgren, G; Ethan Prow, D
 2017–18: Jimmy Schuldt, D
 2018–19: Jimmy Schuldt, D; Patrick Newell, F; Ryan Poehling, F; Blake Lizotte, F
 2021–22: Nick Perbix, D

Second Team All-NCHC

 2013–14: Ryan Faragher, G
 2015–16: Joey Benik, F; Kalle Kossila, F
 2017–18: Mikey Eyssimont, F
 2018–19: Dávid Hrenák, G; Jack Ahcan, D
 2019–20: Dávid Hrenák, G; Jack Ahcan, D
 2020–21: Nick Perbix, D; Veeti Miettinen, F
 2021–22: Kevin Fitzgerald, F

NCHC All-Rookie Team

 2013–14: Charlie Lindgren, G
 2014–15: Patrick Russell, F
 2015–16: Jimmy Schuldt, D; Will Borgen, F
 2016–17: Jack Ahcan, D
 2017–18: Dávid Hrenák, G; Blake Lizotte, F; Easton Brodzinski, F
 2018–19: Nick Perbix, D; Nolan Walker, F
 2020–21: Veeti Miettinen, F

Olympians
This is a list of St. Cloud State alumni were a part of an Olympic team.

Huskies in the NHL
As of July 1, 2022

Source:

See also
St. Cloud State Huskies women's ice hockey
St. Cloud State Huskies
St. Cloud State University

References

External links

 
Ice hockey teams in Minnesota